Luiz Carlos Nascimento Júnior (born 3 January 1987), commonly known as Luizão, is a Brazilian footballer who plays as a central defender for Noroeste, on loan from Portuguesa.

Club career
Luizão was brought up from the Cruzeiro youth squad and made his professional debut for them against Grêmio in a 3–1 home win in the Campeonato Brasileiro on April 23, 2006.

He scored his first professional goal for Cruzeiro against Figueirense in a 2–0 away win in the Campeonato Brasileiro on April 30, 2006.

In July 2007, Luizão was transferred to FC Locarno. Two weeks after he was transferred, not even playing a single game for FC Locarno, Luizão was sent back to Brazil, on loan at Vasco da Gama.
He signed for Grimsby Town in 2012 and made 1 appearance for them scoring 1 before getting released.

International career
Luizão played in the 2007 FIFA U-20 World Cup. He played in all four matches that Brazil were involved in. Unfortunately Brazil were eliminated in the quarter final, where Luizão managed to receive his only yellow card of the tournament, in the 116th minute.

Honours
Cruzeiro
 Campeonato Mineiro: 2006

References

External links

1987 births
Living people
Sportspeople from Espírito Santo
Brazilian footballers
Brazil youth international footballers
Brazil under-20 international footballers
Brazilian expatriate footballers
Expatriate footballers in Uzbekistan
Expatriate soccer players in the United States
Brazilian expatriate sportspeople in the United States
Campeonato Brasileiro Série B players
Campeonato Brasileiro Série C players
Campeonato Brasileiro Série D players
Cruzeiro Esporte Clube players
CR Vasco da Gama players
Esporte Clube Bahia players
Nacional Esporte Clube (MG) players
Ceará Sporting Club players
Associação Desportiva Cabofriense players
ABC Futebol Clube players
Grêmio Novorizontino players
Esporte Clube Água Santa players
Esporte Clube São Bento players
Associação Ferroviária de Esportes players
Associação Atlética Ponte Preta players
Mirassol Futebol Clube players
Brusque Futebol Clube players
Associação Portuguesa de Desportos players
FC Locarno players
FC Bunyodkor players
Association football defenders
Esporte Clube Noroeste players